The 1911–12 South Carolina men's basketball team represents University of South Carolina during the 1911–12 college men's basketball season. The head coach was James Driver coaching the Gamecocks in his first season. The team had finished with a final record of 3–4.

Schedule

|-

References

South Carolina Gamecocks men's basketball seasons
South Carolina
South Carol
South Carol